Romance of a Horsethief is a 1971 French-Italian-Yugoslav adventure film directed by Abraham Polonsky. It is loosely based on the 1917 novel with the same name by Joseph Opatoshu.

Plot summary 
In Polish Russia, Stoloff, a Cossack in exile has gained control over a Jewish village. The villagers live by horse-thievery and under the leadership of Kifke. Stoloff's regime is tolerated until he commandeers the village's horses for the Russian army. Naomi has been away in France and gotten ideas of a revolution and inspires the town to resist. This gets Naomi into deep trouble, from which only Kifke and his compatriot Zanvil can rescue her. Zanvil is highly motivated since he is in love with Naomi.

Cast 

Yul Brynner as Captain  Stoloff
Eli Wallach as Kifke
Jane Birkin as Naomi
Lainie Kazan as  Estusha
David Opatoshu as  Schloime Kradnik
Serge Gainsbourg as  Sigmund
Henri Serre as Mendel (credited as Henri Sera)
Linda Veras as Countess Grabowsky
Marilù Tolo as  Manka
 Branko Plesa as Lt. Vishinsky
 Vladimir Bacic as Gruber
 Branko Spoljar as  Strugatch
 Alenka Rancic as  Sura 
Oliver Tobias as  Zanvill Kradnik

Production
Filming began in July 1970 in Yugoslavia. Polonsky called the film "a fairytale, pretending to affect an older style but in fact the contrary."

Reception
The Los Angeles Times called the film "impressive... a rollicking folk tale."

References

External links

French adventure films
Italian adventure films
Yugoslav adventure films
1970s adventure films
Films about Jews and Judaism
English-language French films
English-language Italian films
English-language Yugoslav films
Films set in the 1900s
Films set in the Russian Empire
Films set in Poland
Films about horses
Films about theft
1970s English-language films
1970s French films
1970s Italian films